William Theodore Mueller (born September 10, 1980) is an American professional wrestler, better known by his ring name, Trevor Murdoch. He is currently signed to the National Wrestling Alliance where he is a former two-time NWA Worlds Heavyweight Champion and former WildKat Sports Heavyweight Champion. He is also a former one-time NWA National Champion.

Murdoch is best known for his appearances with World Wrestling Entertainment from 2005 to 2008. He is also known for his appearances in Extreme Championship Wrestling and NWA Total Nonstop Action as Stan Dupp (a member of The Dupps) and Jethro Holliday, respectively.

Professional wrestling career

Early career (1999–2005) 

Mueller started his career training in Central States Wrestling Alliance, in the Missouri area, in 1997. He then moved on to World League Wrestling (WLW) and Harley Race's Wrestling Academy training camp in 1999 and began his wrestling career in WLW. On April 11, 2000, as Trevor Rhodes, he won the WLW Heavyweight Championship by defeating Meng. He then made a name for himself as part of The Dupps, a hillbilly tag team consisting of kayfabe brothers Stan Dupp (Mueller) and Bo Dupp. As a team, The Dupps wrestled in Extreme Championship Wrestling (ECW), Ohio Valley Wrestling (OVW), and Total Nonstop Action Wrestling (TNA). While in OVW, Mueller teamed with Lance Cade. The team was known as TNT. Mueller signed a WWE development deal in June 2005.

World Wrestling Entertainment (2005–2008) 

Mueller signed a 3-year deal with World Wrestling Entertainment in July, 2005. On August 22, 2005 a promo was shown showcasing Mueller's debut along with the returning Lance Cade. He was repackaged as Trevor Murdoch (the surname coming from his likeness to wrestling legend Dick Murdoch, though the two are not related), and the team was simply known as Cade and Murdoch. Cade, playing a smooth-talking cowboy, while Murdoch appeared to be an angry "white trash" southern trucker.

Cade and Murdoch won their debut match on the September 5, 2005, episode of Raw. They defeated World Tag Team Champions Hurricane and Rosey in a non-title match, earning themselves a title match at Unforgiven. During the match, Murdoch delivered an elevated DDT on The Hurricane to the outside, causing The Hurricane to suffer a stinger. This allowed Cade and Murdoch to win the World Tag Team Championship. They would eventually lose their title at Taboo Tuesday to Big Show and Kane.

On November 28 during his match against Shelton Benjamin, commentator Joey Styles acknowledged that Murdoch and Lance Cade were no longer a tag team. It was revealed on WWE Unlimited, that Trevor Murdoch set his sights on Ric Flair and the WWE Intercontinental Championship. On Unlimited, Murdoch had been reviewing movies that were, at the time, playing in theaters, such as Brokeback Mountain, King Kong, and Hostel. The first two movie reviews displayed various sexual habits, while the third showed cruelty in his past. The underlying point of all the reviews that Murdoch was trying to convey is that he believes "city folk" have quite an easy life, as opposed to his.

After breaking up with Cade, he wrestled in singles competition on Heat, normally winning most of his matches while still making small appearances on Raw. He would also have a short feud with The Heart Throbs on Heat which involved him defeating both of them in singles action and gaining a spot in the 2006 Royal Rumble, though he did not win. He then moved on to a short feud with Goldust but was unsuccessful in beating him. He would then feud with both Goldust and his tag partner Snitsky. This led to him helping former partner Cade win his matches and hinted at the two of them reforming their team.

Cade and Murdoch later reformed their tag team, with Cade having a new look with long jet black hair. On the September 4 edition of Raw, Murdoch and Cade lost a number one contender's Triple Threat Match for the World Tag Team Title at Unforgiven. Murdoch and Cade then starred in a WWE.com skit, parodying a KFC commercial, where Murdoch mistakenly told Cade he ate the bones, despite eating the boneless original recipe bites. The Highlanders won the match when they pinned Charlie Haas who was teamed with Viscera. Murdoch and Cade then joined forces with Edge to oppose D-Generation X (Triple H and Shawn Michaels).

Cade and Murdoch began a feud in April with World Tag Team Champions The Hardys, leading to their title match at Backlash, which The Hardys won. Cade and Murdoch suddenly gained a great deal of respect for The Hardys and began to praise their abilities. The Hardys then began an alliance with Cade and Murdoch. Despite the alliance, Cade and Murdoch faced The Hardys in a rematch at Judgment Day which The Hardys won. On the June 4 edition of Raw, Cade and Murdoch were given another shot at the World Tag Team Championship against The Hardys. Cade and Murdoch were finally successful, becoming two time World Tag Team Champions. When Cade made the pin on Jeff Hardy, Hardy's foot was on the ropes but was pushed off by Murdoch. After the match, when Matt Hardy argued with Cade and Murdoch, they attacked Matt and Jeff with the tag belts, becoming heels once again. They successfully defended their titles against The Hardys at Vengeance: Night of Champions after Cade pinned Jeff and claimed they retained their belts "all by the rules". After that Cade and Murdoch appeared on Raw and Heat in matches against London and Kendrick, The Highlanders, and Cryme Tyme. On July 23 on Raw, Cade and Murdoch teamed up with Umaga to face John Cena and Candice in a Champions-only handicap tag team match. During the match, Cade and Murdoch trapped Candice in order to set her up for Umaga to attack, until Jeff Hardy came out and attacked Umaga with a steel chair. After Candice left scared, and Umaga was chased to the back by Jeff, Cade & Murdoch were left to square off against John Cena. Cena defeated them when he threw Cade out of the ring and gave Murdoch an FU. Murdoch, along with Cade lost the titles at a house show on September 5 to Paul London and Brian Kendrick, but beat them to take the titles back on the last day of the tour. Murdoch and Cade remained champions until the Raw XV Anniversary show, losing the World Tag Team Championships to the team of Hardcore Holly and Cody Rhodes.

Late in April 2008, Murdoch began to develop a country singing gimmick. On the May 12 edition of Raw, Cade turned on Murdoch following a "victory song," punching Murdoch in the face twice, ending the partnership. The two faced off on the June 2 edition of Raw, with Cade getting the victory.

As part of the 2008 WWE Supplemental Draft, Murdoch was drafted to the SmackDown brand but was released from his WWE contract on July 3, 2008 before his debut.

Independent circuit (2008–2011)

On July 9, 2008, IWA Mid-South announced that Mueller would be wrestling against Insane Lane as Trevor Murdock at their Gory Days 4 show on July 26 in Sellersburg, Indiana, followed by a match against Nick Gage at Put Up or Shut Up 2008 on August 16 in Portage, Indiana. On August 24, Trevor Murdock lost in an attempt to capture the NWA World Heavyweight Championship from Brent Albright. Lance Cade was released from his WWE contract on October 14, 2008, and less than a week later Cade and Murdoch began accepting bookings together as a team on the independent circuit, including IWA-Mid South. On October 18, Murdoch returned to World League Wrestling facing Chris Masters and Go Shiozaki in a match for the WLW Heavyweight Championship. Murdoch participated in Revolution Strong Style Tournament and Candido Cup and lost both. Murdoch made several appearances for Championship Wrestling from Hollywood before joining Total Nonstop Action Wrestling and continued to make independent appearances while signed to TNA.

In 2010, after leaving TNA, Murdoch defeated Trent Stone in a leather strap match for the WLW Heavyweight Championship and won the MPW Heavyweight Championship in October. He lost the MPW Heavyweight Championship to Derek Stone in the beginning to 2011 and would eventually vacate the WLW Heavyweight Championship. In March, Murdoch toured Pro Wrestling Noah and had a shot at the GHC Heavyweight Championship.

Prior to the live broadcast of Raw on May 9, 2011, Mueller wrestled as 'Trevor Murdoch' in a dark match, which he lost to Evan Bourne. He wrestled a dark match the following night prior to the SmackDown tapings, losing to Jey Uso. On June 17, Mueller announced that he was going to be signing a contract to return to WWE; however, on June 29 he revealed that the deal had fallen through due to budget cuts. As a result, Mueller reportedly considered retiring from professional wrestling.

In November, Murdoch participated in Noah's Global League 2011 in block B. He earned eight points but that was not enough to progress to the next stage. In December 2011, Murdoch took part in TNA's India project, Ring Ka King under the name Roscoe Jackson.

Total Nonstop Action Wrestling (2009)
Mueller debuted in Total Nonstop Action Wrestling (TNA) on the April 23, 2009 edition of TNA Impact!, under the name "The Outlaw" Jethro Holliday, teaming with Eric Young to defeat the team of No Limit (Naito and Yujiro), advancing to the second round of Team 3D's open invitational tag team tournament. On the May 7 episode of Impact! Holliday and Young lost to Beer Money, Inc. getting eliminated from the tournament. The following week he lost in an "I Quit Match" against Booker T. On June 18,  Holliday lost a Clockwork Orange House of Fun match against Raven. On August 13, he turned heel by attacking Abyss with a steel chair, in response to the "bounty" set by Dr. Stevie. At Hard Justice he lost to Abyss and after the match turned face once again by attacking Dr. Stevie. During this time, he was used as a jobber putting over the likes of Bobby Lashley and Daniels. Holliday competed in four Webmatches, On June 5, Holliday and Young defeated No Limit. On June 26, Holliday defeated Jesse Neal. On August 13, Holliday lost to Rhino. On October 9, Holliday lost to Daniels. On November 11, 2009, Mueller was released from his TNA contract.

Ring Ka King (2012)
Mueller debuted for Ring Ka King under the name Roscoe Jackson and on February 4, 2012, Jackson, Jimmy Rave and Zema Ion defeated Broadway, Hollywood and Isaiah Cash in a six-man tag team match. on February 12 tapings Jackson lost to "The Outlaw" Isaiah Cash. on February 25 tapings Jackson faced American Adonis in a losing effort. on February 26, Jackson was in the #1 contenders gauntlet for the gold match won by Sir Brutus Magnus. on March 17 tapings Jackson defeated Isaiah Cash. on March 31 tapings Jackson lost a remmatch against Isaiah Cash. on April 8 tapings Jackson was in the #1 contenders battle royal for the heavyweight title won by Mahabali Vera. on April 23 at the final tapings for the promotion Jackson,  Chavo Guerrero Jr, Mahabali Veera, Matt Morgan and Pagal Parinda defeated RDX (Abyss, Deadly Danda, Scott Steiner, Sir Brutus Magnus and Sonjay Dutt) in a ten-man tag team match. Ring Ka King shut down on April 22, 2012 and did not return for a second season.

Independent circuit and retirement (2013–2018)
On May 4, 2013, back under the ring name Trevor Murdoch, he faced Mitch Paradise in a losing effort. On May 5, 2013, Murdoch and Heather Patera defeated Dan Jesser and Shelly Martinez in a mix tag team match. On August 23, 2014, Murdoch competed for the Heavy on Wrestling title but lost to Lance Hoyt in a 3-way match. On September 7, Murdoch faced Nate Redwing in a losing effort. On January 17, 2015, Murdoch faced Derek McQuinn in a losing effort. On February 15,  Murdoch lost a 3 way match against Blake Edward Belakis. On April 5, Murdoch faced Jonathan Gresham in a losing effort. On April 18, Murdoch and Leland Race faced Derek McQuinn and Steve Fender in the semi-finals tag team tournament that ended in a no contest. Mueller announced his retirement from wrestling in 2018.

National Wrestling Alliance (2019–present)

NWA National Heavyweight Champion (2019–2021)
Murdoch came out of retirement in 2019 and appeared at the first taping for NWA Power. In his first match, he lost to Ricky Starks. He interrupted Starks' post-match interview and congratulated him, establishing himself as a face. Later, he cut his own promo, stating that he wished to earn an NWA contract. He would then be victorious in matches against Jocephus and Caleb Konley, and lose in a competitive outing against reigning NWA Worlds Heavyweight Champion Nick Aldis in a non-title match. On September 29, 2020, Murdoch defeated Aron Stevens to win the NWA National Heavyweight Championship. Murdoch held the title for 182 days before losing it to Chris Adonis.

NWA Worlds Heavyweight Champion (2021–present)
Following the end of his National championship reign, Murdoch reignited his feud with Aldis. This resulted in several losing efforts against Aldis for the NWA Worlds Heavyweight Championship, before Murdoch ultimately won the belt from Aldis in the main event of NWA 73rd Anniversary Show. On December 4, at Hard Times 2, Murdoch made his first successful title defense against Mike Knox.

On February 12, 2022, Murdoch lost the NWA Worlds Heavyweight Championship to Matt Cardona in Oak Grove, Kentucky at NWA PowerrrTrip, bringing Murdoch's championship reign to an end after 167 days. On June 11, Murdoch defeated Aldis, Thom Latimer, and Sam Shaw in a fatal four-way match for the vacant title at Alwayz Ready in Knoxville, Tennessee. On August 28, Murdoch successfully defended the title against Tyrus on Night 2 of the NWA 74th Anniversary Show. On November 12, at Hard Times 3, Murdoch lost the title to Tyrus in a three-way match that involved Cardona, ending his second reign at 154 days.

Other media
Mueller appeared as Trevor Murdoch as a playable character in two video games: WWE SmackDown vs. Raw 2007 and WWE SmackDown vs. Raw 2009.

Personal life
Mueller has two sons and is the stepfather to his wife's daughter from a previous relationship.

Mueller has a tattoo of the Looney Tunes character The Tasmanian Devil on his right upper biceps. Mueller spends time at the Harley Race's Wrestling Academy working with new and upcoming wrestlers in the training program.

He and his wife, Amanda, owned T. Murdock’s Bar and Grill in downtown Eldon, Missouri, which he sold in December 2013.

In an April 2014 interview for WWE's website in their "Where Are They Now?" series, Mueller said his current occupation was installing fibre optic cables for a heavy equipment company.

Championships and accomplishments

Cauliflower Alley Club
Future Legend Award (2009)
Metro Pro Wrestling
MPW Television Championship (1 time)
National Wrestling Alliance
NWA Worlds Heavyweight Championship (2 times)
NWA National Championship (1 time)
NWA Champions Series Tournament (2021) – with Team Jax Dane, Jennacide, The Masked Mystery Man, and Colby Corino
NWA Total Nonstop Action
Dupp Cup (1 time) – with Bo Dupp
Pro Wrestling Illustrated
Ranked No. 75 of the top 500 singles wrestlers in the PWI 500 in 2022
WildKat Wrestling
WildKat Sports Heavyweight Championship (1 time, current)
World League Wrestling
WLW Heavyweight Championship (5 times)
WLW Tag Team Championship (3 times) - with Bull Schmitt (1) and Wade Chism (2)
World Wrestling Entertainment
World Tag Team Championship (3 times) - with Lance Cade
World Wrestling Xpress
WWX Heavyweight Championship** (1 time)
WWX United States Championship (1 time)

Luchas de Apuestas record

References

External links 

 
 Twitter
 

1980 births
20th-century professional wrestlers
21st-century professional wrestlers
American male professional wrestlers
Living people
NWA World Heavyweight Champions
People from Coffeyville, Kansas
People from Eldon, Missouri
People from Madison County, Missouri
People from Waxahachie, Texas
Professional wrestlers from Kansas
NWA National Heavyweight Champions